Konrad Kapler (25 February 1925 – 23 October 1991) was a Polish footballer who played for Celtic from 1947 to 1949. He had previously played for the Forres Mechanics and was scouted for the club whilst playing in an exhibition match for the Polish Army. The right sided midfielder found his first team opportunities limited and was released in 1949 after only 8 appearances; he then played for Rochdale, for whom he made four league appearances

References 

Celtic F.C. players
Expatriate footballers in England
Expatriate footballers in Scotland
Association football forwards
Polish expatriate footballers
Polish footballers
Rochdale A.F.C. players
Scottish Football League players
English Football League players
Morecambe F.C. players
Congleton Town F.C. players
Altrincham F.C. players
Stalybridge Celtic F.C. players
Mossley A.F.C. players
1991 deaths
Forres Mechanics F.C. players
People from Tychy
1925 births
Sportspeople from Silesian Voivodeship